William Anthony Davies (16 September 1939 – 6 April 2008) was a New Zealand rugby union footballer, who played 17 games for the All Blacks in 1960 and 1962 as a full-back or centre.

Davies was nominated for the All Blacks while playing for the University of Auckland's rugby union team, and made his debut on 14 May 1960 in Sydney, Australia against Queensland. His international debut was against South Africa on 27 August. He played 14 games for the All Blacks that year, then transferred to Dunedin to study medicine, where he played 39 games for the University of Otago. In 1962, Davies returned to the All Blacks for two games against Australia, bringing his total national caps to 17.

Whilst furthering his medical studies in England, Davies played for Blackheath (1971, 1972) and London Irish (1972–74).

Davies died in Sydney, Australia on 6 April 2008.

References

1939 births
2008 deaths
Rugby union players from Auckland
New Zealand international rugby union players
London Irish players
New Zealand rugby union players
University of Auckland alumni
University of Otago alumni
People educated at King's College, Auckland
Auckland rugby union players
Otago rugby union players
Rugby union fullbacks